Directorate of the President of the Russian Federation is a federal executive body (federal agency) that organizes and directly provides material and technical support and social, medical, and sanatorium and resort services for the activities of federal government bodies. Created on November 15, 1993 by Presidential decree No. 735-rp to replace Main Social and Industrial Administration of the Administration of the President of the Russian Federation (GSPU). Since August 2, 1995 it has the status of a federal executive body and as of 2013 employs 500 workers.

Overview
It is dealing also with business management, organizes and directly implements, in the manner established by the legislation of the Russian Federation, financial support for the activities of the President of the Russian Federation, the Government of the Russian Federation, the Presidential Administration of Russia and the Office of the Government of the Russian Federation. he funds received by the Department of Affairs from the management of its subordinate organizations and from the management and disposal of federal property under its jurisdiction, including property assigned to subordinate organizations, cannot be used to remunerate the staff of the Department of Affairs. The procedure for using these funds is determined by the Department of Affairs in coordination with the Ministry of Finance of the Russian Federation.

Organizations subordinate to the Office of Administration are federal state unitary enterprises and federal state institutions included in the list of federal state unitary enterprises and federal state institutions subordinate to the Office of the President of the Russian Federation, as well as federal property objects, the management and disposal of which are entrusted to the Office of the President of the Russian Federation.

Structure
Control department
Audit Department
Department of Internal Financial Audit
Procurement Control Department
Mobilization department
Main Medical Department
Department of medical care
Department of emergency medical care and hospitalization
Contingent accounting department
Department of Pharmaceutical and Medical-Technical Activities
Department of organizing spa care and marketing
Department of Innovation and Modern Medical Technologies
General Directorate of Housing and Social Services
Department of hotel complexes and halls of officials and delegations
Contract Division
Housing department
Department of consumer services and subordinate organizations
General Directorate of Capital Construction
Construction Preparation Department
Technical department
Planning department
Department of Targeted Programs
General Directorate for International Cooperation
Department of Foreign Property and International Cooperation
Department of Protocol Events and Delegation Services
General Directorate of Catering
Event and Food Service Department
Department of Agriculture and Trade
General Directorate of Federal Property

References

Government of Russia
Politics of Russia